Mapungubwe Mambas is a South African field hockey club. The club was established in 2016, and is one of 6 established to compete in South African Hockey Association's new premier domestic competition, Premier Hockey League.

History
The Mapungubwe Mambas have been inspired by famous tourist areas in Mapungubwe National Park in Limpopo.

Tournament history

Premier Hockey League
 2016 - 5th
 2017 - 
 2018 - 6th
 2019 -

Teams
The men's team was announced on 10 July 2019.

Head Coach: Lungile Tsolekile

References

Field hockey clubs in South Africa
Field hockey clubs established in 2016
2016 establishments in South Africa
Premier Hockey League (South Africa)